All Saints Church is a Grade II listed church in Adstone, Northamptonshire, England.

References

Grade II listed churches in Northamptonshire